= Improtheater Emscherblut =

Theatre group in North Rhine-Westphalia, Germany

Improtheater Emscherblut is a theatre group in North Rhine-Westphalia, Germany founded in 1987.
